Bruce Lee: The Man, The Myth (also known as Bruce Lee: The True Story) is a 1976 Hong Kong semi biographical martial arts film starring Ho Chung-tao (Bruce Li) and directed by Ng See-yuen. The film was released in Hong Kong on 28 October 1976.

Plot 
The film chronicles Bruce Lee's life beginning with Lee leaving China to go to the University in Seattle. Most of the benchmarks of Lee's later life (cast in Green Hornet television series, marriage to Linda Lee, stardom in Hong Kong, death) are covered, with a somewhat less tenuous relationship to the truth than in previous Lee biopics.

Cast 
 Ho Chung-tao – Bruce Lee
 Unicorn Chan – Himself
 Chiu Chi-ling – Mr. Chan
 Fung Ging-man – Lee Sifu
 Alan Chui Chung-San – One of Bruce Lee's students
 Sham Chin-bo – Bruce Lee's friend in San Francisco
 Mars – Charlie
 Fung Hak-on – Challenger to Bruce Lee on Enter the Dragon Set
 Hoi Sang Lee – Challenger to Bruce Lee on Enter the Dragon Set
 Yuen Biao – Challenges Bruce Lee on the set of Enter the Dragon
 Carl Scott – One of Bruce Lee's young students
 Wong Mei – Extra
 Fong Yuen – Fortune teller
 Lau Kwok-shing – Bad guy extra Enter the Dragon
 Leung Siu-cheng – Master beaten on street
 David Chow – Murayaki
 Lynda Hirst – Linda Lee
 Ip Chun – Ip Man, Bruce Lee's Wing Chun Sifu
 Roberta Ciappi – Daughter of Italian Mobster
 Donnie Williams – Karate Thug
 Siu Yuk-lung – Extra
 Richard Cheung Kuen – Student
 Chung Chaan-chi
 Gam Tin-chue

Production 
Linda Lee was played by Lynda Hirst, an English woman who was an army wife stationed in Hong Kong at the time of the filming. The director, having searched unsuccessfully for some time for a suitable 'Linda Lee' among available actresses, came across Lynda Hirst whilst out shopping in a local market and remarked on her resemblance to the late star's wife. On learning she was a 'Westerner' he immediately cast her in the (small) role. Lynda's real life sons can also be seen, very briefly, in the movie as Lee's children.

Release 
On 22 May 2000, DVD was released by Mia in the United Kingdom in Region 2. Two years later, Martial Arts Films Box Set DVD was released on 23 December 2002, at a 4 disc set that includes Black Friday, Legacy of Rage, and Rumble in Hong Kong. In the United States the film has been released on DVD several times due to it being in the public domain.

Reception 
In his three part Bruceploitation essay for Impact Magazine, Dean Meadows writes: "This was a bigger and better production, providing a larger budget, international locations and the name Ho Chung Tao on the opening credits. Upon its release, earlier, scandalous elements of the exploitational deluge had all but disappeared. Overlong scenes of the Little Dragon "in action" with Betty Ting Pei were absent from the production and the full contact fury that people had been waiting to see from a Bruce Lee bio-pic was finally realised. Every director can of course be afforded a little artistic license and whilst a number of fight scenes were completely fictionalised, Ng See Yuen had undoubtedly created a fitting tribute to the memory of the undisputed "King of Kung Fu". With first class choreography, Ho Chung Tao mirrored the Little Dragon in a number of standout fights."

The Time Out Film Guide, for example: "Numbingly unimaginative and exploitative biography. Would you trust a film that opens on a '70s street scene and captions it 'Hong Kong 1958'?"

Joseph Kuby gave the film 7 out of 10 and said: "Missed opportunity on behalf of the filmmakers to add some depth to the film if they took the film more seriously (i.e. make it as credible as it is incredible), but still a fun effort that should please Bruce Lee fans and chop-socky aficionados who don't seem to mind watching films where a star is exploited for the gain of big bucks and shallow entertainment - though having said that there's much better in that regard (especially within the realm of Bruceploitation fare...or really farce)!"

References

External links 
 

1976 films
1976 martial arts films
1970s biographical films
Bruceploitation films
Films about Bruce Lee
Films set in Los Angeles
Films set in Hong Kong
Films set in San Francisco
Films set in Seattle
Films shot in Taiwan
Films shot in Thailand
Hong Kong biographical films
Hong Kong martial arts films
Kung fu films
1970s Mandarin-language films
Biographical films about actors
1980s Hong Kong films
1970s Hong Kong films